Niclas Bergfors (born 7 March 1987) is a Swedish professional ice hockey right winger currently an unrestricted free agent. He most recently played for Djurgårdens IF then of the Swedish Hockey League (SHL). He was drafted by the National Hockey League (NHL)'s New Jersey Devils in the first round, 23rd overall, at the 2005 NHL Entry Draft, playing for the organization for four-and-a-half seasons before joining the Atlanta Thrashers 2010, Florida Panthers in 2011 and Nashville Predators via free agency in 2011. He later joined the KHL's Ak Bars Kazan in late 2011 before signing with Severstal Cherepovets. In 2013, he joined Admiral Vladivostok, where he played for three seasons before joining Amur Khabarovsk in a mid-season trade.

Playing career
In 2004–05, prior to being drafted to the NHL, Bergfors played for hometown club Södertälje SK of the Elitserien.

Bergfors spent the 2005–06 season with the New Jersey Devils' American Hockey League (AHL) affiliate, the Albany River Rats, scoring 17 goals and 40 points in 65 games. During the season, he represented Sweden at the 2006 World Junior Ice Hockey Championships, scoring three goals and six points in six games.

In 2006–07, Bergfors played for New Jersey's new AHL affiliate, the Lowell Devils, where he scored 13 goals and 32 points in 60 games. He once again played with Sweden in the 2007 World Junior Championships, where he posted two assists in seven games.

Bergfors returned to Lowell for the 2007–08 season, where he saw his production decrease to 12 goals and 27 points in 66 games. He did make his NHL debut, however, going pointless in one game with New Jersey. He spent the majority of the 2008–09 season with Lowell, scoring 22 goals and 51 points in 66 games, also playing in eight games with New Jersey, scoring one goal.

In 2009–10, Bergfors made the Devils' opening day roster, and in 54 games with New Jersey, he scored 13 goals and 27 points. On 4 February 2010, however, the Devils traded Bergfors, along with Johnny Oduya, Patrice Cormier and their first-round pick in 2010, to the Atlanta Thrashers in exchange for Ilya Kovalchuk, Anssi Salmela and Atlanta's second-round pick in 2010.

Bergfors finished 2009–10 with Atlanta, where he scored eight goals and 17 points in 27 games. After the season, he was named to the NHL All-Rookie Team after scoring 21 goals and 44 points in 81 games with both the Devils and Thrashers. In 2010–11, Bergfors saw his numbers slide, scoring 11 goals and 29 points in 52 games with Atlanta. On 28 February 2011, the Thrashers traded Bergfors and Patrick Rissmiller to the Florida Panthers for Radek Dvořák and Florida's fifth-round draft pick in 2011.

On 4 July 2011, Bergfors signed a one-year, $575,000 contract with the Nashville Predators as a free agent. He was put on unconditional waivers by the Predators on 24 November 2011, making him a free agent.

Bergfors then signed with the Ak Bars Kazan on 2 December 2011, playing just eight games before joining Severstal Cherepovets on a two-year contract. In June 2013, he was drafted at the KHL Expansion Draft by Admiral Vladivostok.

After 12 years playing professionally abroad, Bergfors returned to his native Sweden agreeing to a two-year contract with Linköpings HC of the SHL on May 4, 2016. On February 15, 2017, Niklas left mid-season to sign a contract with fellow SHL club, Djurgårdens IF Hockey until the end of the 2018 season.

Career statistics

Regular season and playoffs

International

References

External links
 

1987 births
Living people
People from Södertälje
Admiral Vladivostok players
Ak Bars Kazan players
Albany River Rats players
Amur Khabarovsk players
Atlanta Thrashers players
Djurgårdens IF Hockey players
Florida Panthers players
Linköping HC players
Lowell Devils players
Nashville Predators players
National Hockey League first-round draft picks
New Jersey Devils draft picks
New Jersey Devils players
Severstal Cherepovets players
Södertälje SK players
Swedish ice hockey right wingers
Swedish expatriate ice hockey players in the United States
Sportspeople from Stockholm County